Satyawan Savitri is an Indian Marathi language television mythological series which was produced by The Film Clique. It was aired on Zee Marathi by replacing Man Jhala Bajind. It stars Vedangi Kulkarni and Aditya Durve in lead roles.

Cast 
 Vedangi Kulkarni as Savitri
 Radha Dharne as Child Savitri
 Aditya Durve as Satyawan
 Arnav Kalkundri as Child Satyawan
 Vikram Gaikwad as Satyawan's father
 Prasanna Ketkar as Savitri's father
 Varsha Ghatpande as Savitri's grandmother
 Bageshree Deshpande
 Nandkishor Chikhale

Reception

Special episode (1 hour) 
 12 June 2022
 31 July 2022

References

External links 
 
 Satyawan Savitri at ZEE5
 
Marathi-language television shows
2022 Indian television series debuts
Zee Marathi original programming
2022 Indian television series endings